"Atoms for Peace" was the title of a speech delivered by U.S. President Dwight D. Eisenhower to the UN General Assembly in New York City on December 8, 1953.

The United States then launched an "Atoms for Peace" program that supplied equipment and information to schools, hospitals, and research institutions within the U.S. and throughout the world. The first nuclear reactors in Israel and Islamabad in Pakistan  were built under the program by American Machine and Foundry, a company more commonly known as a major manufacturer of bowling equipment.

Philosophy

The speech was part of a carefully orchestrated media campaign, called "Operation Candor", to enlighten the American public on the risks and hopes of a nuclear future. Both Operation Candor and Atoms for Peace were influenced by the January 1953 report of the State Department Panel of Consultants on Disarmament, which urged that the United States government practice less secrecy and more honesty toward the American people about the realities of the nuclear balance and the dangers of nuclear warfare,  which triggered in Eisenhower a desire to seek a new and different approach to the threat of nuclear war in international relations.

"Atoms for Peace" was a propaganda component of the Cold War strategy of containment. Eisenhower's speech opened a media campaign that would last for years and that aimed at "emotion management", balancing fears of continuing nuclear armament with promises of peaceful use of uranium in future nuclear reactors. The speech was a tipping point for international focus on peaceful uses of atomic energy, even during the early stages of the Cold War. Eisenhower, with some influence from J. Robert Oppenheimer, may have been attempting to convey a spirit of comfort to a terrified world after the horror of Hiroshima and Nagasaki and of the nuclear tests of the early 1950s.

It presented an ostensible antithesis to brinkmanship, the international intrigue that subsequently kept the world at the edge of war.

However, recent historians have tended to see the speech as a cold war maneuver directed primarily at U.S. allies in Europe. Eisenhower wanted to make sure that the European allies would go along with the shift in NATO strategy from an emphasis on conventional weapons to cheaper nuclear weapons. Western Europeans wanted reassurance that the U.S. did not intend to provoke a nuclear war in Europe, and the speech was designed primarily to create that sense of reassurance. Eisenhower later said that he knew the Soviets would reject the specific proposal he offered in the speech.

Eisenhower's invoking of "those same great concepts of universal peace and human dignity which are so clearly etched in" the UN Charter placed new emphasis upon the U.S. responsibility for its nuclear actions—past, present, and future. This address laid down the rules of engagement for the new kind of warfare: the cold war.

Two quotations from the speech follow:

Effects of the speech

Prior to Eisenhower's speech, the state of atomic development in the world was under strict secrecy. The information and expertise needed for atomic development was bound by the secret Quebec Agreement of 1943 and thus not devoted to peaceful processes, but instead as a weapon to defend against other countries which were developing and using the same weaponry. With atomic development thus far under wraps, there were no safety protocols and no standards developed.

Eisenhower's speech was an important moment in political history as it brought the atomic issue which had been kept quiet for "national security" into the public eye, asking the world to support his solution. Eisenhower was determined to solve "the fearful atomic dilemma" by finding some way by which "the miraculous inventiveness of man would not be dedicated to his death, but consecrated to his life." Unfortunately, Eisenhower was not completely effective in his repurposing; Eisenhower himself approved the National Security Council (NSC) document which stated that only a massive atomic weapon base would deter violence from the Soviet Union. The belief that to avoid a nuclear war, the United States must stay on the offensive, ready to strike at any time, is the same reason that the Soviet Union would not give up its atomic weapons either. During Eisenhower's time in office the nuclear holdings of the US rose from 1,005 to 20,000 weapons.

The "Atoms for Peace" program opened up nuclear research to civilians and countries that had not previously possessed nuclear technology. Eisenhower argued for a nonproliferation agreement throughout the world and argued for a stop of the spread of military use of nuclear weapons. Although the nations that already had atomic weapons kept their weapons and grew their supplies, very few other countries have developed similar weapons—in this sense, it has been very much contained. The "Atoms for Peace" program also created regulations for the use of nuclear power and through these regulations stopped other countries from developing weapons while allowing the technology to be used for positive means.

Legacy 

Atoms for Peace created the ideological background for the creation of the International Atomic Energy Agency and the Treaty on the Non-Proliferation of Nuclear Weapons, but also gave political cover for the U.S. nuclear weapons build-up, and the backdrop to the Cold War arms race. Under Atoms for Peace related programmes the U.S. exported over 25 tons of highly enriched uranium (HEU) to 30 countries, mostly to fuel research reactors, which is now regarded as a proliferation and terrorism risk. Under a similar program, the Soviet Union exported over 11 tons of HEU.

Research by Matthew Fuhrmann has linked civilian nuclear cooperation to nuclear weapons programs, as the technology, know-how and materials used and generated by civilian nuclear use reduced the costs of pursuing a nuclear weapons program.

See also

 Atoms for Peace Award
 Atoms for Peace Galaxy
 Atomic gardening
 Baruch Plan
 Gammator
 International Atomic Energy Agency
 
 NS Otto Hahn
 Nuclear fuel bank
 Nuclear power plant
 Operation Plowshare
 Pro-nuclear movement
 Shippingport Reactor
 Science diplomacy
 Swords to ploughshares
 World Nuclear University

References

Further reading
 Lavoy, Peter R. (2003). The enduring effects of Atoms for Peace. Arms Control Association
 Hewlett, Richard G.; Holl, Jack M. (1989). Atoms for Peace and War, 1953–1961: Eisenhower and the Atomic Energy Commission. University of California Press.
 Pilat, Joseph F.; Pendley, Robert E.; Ebinger, Charles K. (eds.). Atoms For Peace: An analysis after thirty years. Westview Press.
 US Department of Energy. (2003). Atoms for Peace after 50 years: The new challenges and opportunities. Washington, D.C.
 Varnum, J. (2014). 60 years of Atoms for Peace. Nuclear Engineering International.

External links
Documents regarding President Eisenhower's Atoms for Peace speech, Dwight D. Eisenhower Presidential Library
  Full transcript and original recording
 
Original annotated draft of speech

 
Cold War speeches
1953 in American politics
1953 in international relations
1953 in New York City
1953 speeches
Speeches by Dwight D. Eisenhower
Nuclear history of the United States
Nuclear history
United States and the United Nations
December 1953 events in the United States
Science diplomacy